The Boys Singles tournament of the 2013 BWF World Junior Championships was held from October 29 until November 3. Last year champion, Kento Momota couldn't defend his title due to the age eligibility.

South Korean Heo Kwang-hee won the gold medal after beating Wang Tzu-wei from Chinese Taipei 21-11, 21-12 in the final. It was first boys single gold medal for South Korea after 7 years.

Seeded

  Soo Teck Zhi (third round)
  Thammasin Sitthikom (third round)
  Jeon Hyuk-jin (fourth round)
  Fabian Roth (quarter-final)
  Mark Caljouw (fourth round)
  Heo Kwang-hee (champion)
  Adam Mendrek (third round)
  Ihsan Maulana Mustofa (semi-final)
  Harsheel Dani (second round)
  Aditya Joshi (third round)
  Lars Schaenzler (second round)
  Shi Yuqi (fourth round)
  Soong Joo Ven (quarter-final)
  Justin Teeuwen (second round)
  Pannawit Thongnuam (quarter-final)
  Wang Tzu-wei (final)

Draw

Finals

Top Half

Section 1

Section 2

Section 3

Section 4

Bottom Half

Section 5

Section 6

Section 7

Section 8

References
Main Draw (Archived 2013-10-28)

2013 BWF World Junior Championships
2013 in youth sport